is one of three wards of Sagamihara, Kanagawa, Japan, located in the central part of the city. The north west of Chūō-ku faces Midori-ku; the south east faces Minami-ku; the north faces Machida. 

Chūō-ku was created on April 1, 2010 when Sagamihara became a city designated by government ordinance (a "designated city"). 

As of March 2010, Chūō-ku had a population of 265,057, with a land area of 36.8 square kilometers.

Education
Municipal junior high schools:

 Chuo (中央中学校)
 Kamimizo (上溝中学校)
 Kamimizo Minami (上溝南中学校)
 Kyowa (共和中学校)
 Midorigaoka (緑が丘中学校)
 Ono Kita (大野北中学校)
 Oyama (小山中学校)
 Seishin (清新中学校)
 Tana (田名中学校)
 Yaei (弥栄中学校)
 Yoshinodai (由野台中学校)

Municipal elementary schools:

 Aoba (青葉小学校)
 Chuo (中央小学校)
 Fuchinobe (淵野辺小学校)
 Fuchinobe Higashi (淵野辺東小学校)
 Fujimi (富士見小学校)
 Hikarigaoka (光が丘小学校)
 Hoshigaoka (星が丘小学校)
 Kamimizo (上溝小学校)
 Kamimizo Minami (上溝南小学校)
 Koyo (向陽小学校)
 Kyowa (共和小学校)
 Namiki (並木小学校)
 Ono Kita (大野北小学校)
 Oyama (小山小学校)
 Seishin (清新小学校)
 Shinjuku (新宿小学校)
 Tana (田名小学校)
 Tana Kita (田名北小学校)
 Yaei (弥栄小学校)
 Yokodai (陽光台小学校)
 Yokoyama (横山小学校)

References

Wards of Sagamihara